Michael or Mike Franks may refer to:

 Michael Franks (musician) (born 1944), American jazz singer and songwriter
 Michael Franks (album), his eponymous album released in 1973
 Michael Franks (athlete) (born 1963), American sprinter
 Mike Franks (soccer) (born 1977), Canada soccer goalkeeper
 Mike Franks (tennis) (born 1936), American tennis player
 Mike Franks (NCIS), a fictional character from American television series NCIS